Jarmila Pacherová is a retired Czechoslovak slalom canoeist who competed from the early 1950s to the early 1960s. She won two bronze medals in the mixed C-2 event at the ICF Canoe Slalom World Championships, earning them in 1955 and 1961.

References

Czechoslovak female canoeists
Possibly living people
Year of birth missing
Medalists at the ICF Canoe Slalom World Championships